Baris Ekincier (born 24 March 1999) is a professional footballer who plays as a midfielder for 3. Liga side Waldhof Mannheim. Born in Germany, he has represented Azerbaijan at youth international levels up to the under-21s.

Club career
Ekincier began his football career with the youth teams of FC Iserlohn and Rot-Weiss Essen, before joining the VfL Bochum youth academy in 2017. In August 2017, he played for the first team in a friendly match against Bayer Leverkusen.

In June 2018, Ekincier signed his first professional contract with VfL Bochum, lasting two years until 30 June 2020. On 19 August 2018, he appeared for Bochum in the first round of the 2018–19 DFB-Pokal, coming on as a substitute in the 62nd minute for Tom Weilandt in the 1–0 away loss against Regionalliga Nord side Weiche Flensburg. Ekincier made his 2. Bundesliga debut for Bochum on 5 April 2019, coming on as a substitute in the 74th minute for Miloš Pantović in the 2–1 away loss against Jahn Regensburg.

On 18 July 2019, it was announced that Ekincier had joined SK Austria Klagenfurt on a season-long loan deal.

International career
Ekincier was included in hosts Azerbaijan's squad for the 2016 UEFA European Under-17 Championship in May 2016. He appeared in Azerbaijan's first two matches, with the team being eliminated in the group stage of the tournament.

Personal life
Ekincier was born in the German city of Hemer, North Rhine-Westphalia and is of Turkish descent.

References

External links
 
 
 
 

1999 births
Living people
People from Hemer
Sportspeople from Arnsberg (region)
Association football midfielders
Footballers from North Rhine-Westphalia
Citizens of Azerbaijan through descent
Azerbaijani footballers
Azerbaijan youth international footballers
Azerbaijan under-21 international footballers
German footballers
Azerbaijani people of Turkish descent
German people of Azerbaijani descent
German people of Turkish descent
VfL Bochum players
SK Austria Klagenfurt players
SV Waldhof Mannheim players
2. Bundesliga players
2. Liga (Austria) players
3. Liga players
German expatriate footballers
Azerbaijani expatriate footballers
Expatriate footballers in Austria
Azerbaijani expatriate sportspeople in Austria
German expatriate sportspeople in Austria